Song Ji-hyo's Beauty View, is a South Korean television program on JTBC2 hosted by Song Ji-hyo, Gong Myung and beauty editor Kim Mi Gu. The show provides a perfect beauty guide to match the personal preference. It was used to air on every Thursday at 9.20pm KST on JTBC2.

Format
Ordinary people are invited as the makeup models on the show. The professional makeup artist uses her brushes and works wonders to show viewers about the fascinating beauty world.

List of Episodes

References

2017 South Korean television series debuts
2017 South Korean television series debuts
2017 South Korean television series endings